Beerichthys ingens is an extinct  prehistoric bony fish that was a member of the Ypresian London Clay fauna of lower Eocene England.

It is known only from a series of incomplete skulls.  When originally described in 1966, B. ingens was placed in a monotypic family, "Beerichthyidae," within Iniomi.  Later, more (also incomplete) skulls were studied by Colin Patterson, who determined that the fish was a louvar.

See also

 Prehistoric fish
 List of prehistoric bony fish

References

Eocene fish
Luvaridae
Eocene fish of Europe
Prehistoric ray-finned fish genera